Krishna Bharadwaj may refer to:

 Krishna Bharadwaj (actor) (born 1989), Indian television actor
 Krishna Bharadwaj (economist) (1935–1992), Indian economist